The Capu Biancu is a mountain in the department of Haute-Corse on the island of Corsica, France.

Location

Capu Biancu is on a ridge that forms the boundary between the communes of Asco and Corscia in Haute-Corse.
Other peaks on the ridge are the  Capo al Berdato to the west, and  Capo Razino to the east.
The ridge separates the Asco valley to the north from the Niolo to the south.
The nearest road is the D147 to the north, which runs west from the village of Asco.
The Ruisseau de Ghieriosa rises to the west of the Capu Biancu.
It is a tributary of the Ruisseau de Stranciacone, one of the headwaters of the Asco.

Physical

It is in the Monte Cinto massif.

Hiking

The peak may be accessed from Asco through the Pinara Valley or from the village of Corscia on the Nolo side.
The route from Corscia follows the road and then a marked trail past the Funtana di Callaiola to the Bergerie Caracuto, and then a line of cairns to the lake of Occihi Neri.
From there the route is over scree and rock to the summit.
It takes about ten hours out and back.

Gallery

Notes

Sources

Mountains of Haute-Corse